Yendovsky is a rural locality (a khutor) in Kletsko-Pochtovskoye Rural Settlement, Serafimovichsky District, Volgograd Oblast, Russia. The population was 167 as of 2010. There are 3 streets.

Geography 
Yendovsky is located 64 km northeast of Serafimovich (the district's administrative centre) by road. Kletsko-Pochtovsky is the nearest rural locality.

References 

Rural localities in Serafimovichsky District